Hirtobrasilianus is a genus of beetles in the family Cerambycidae, containing the following species:

 Hirtobrasilianus matogrossensis (Fragoso, 1971)
 Hirtobrasilianus seabrai Fragoso & Tavakilian, 1985
 Hirtobrasilianus villiersi Fragoso & Tavakilian, 1985

References

Cerambycini